Robert John Taylor  (born 1963) is an Australian actor who has appeared in many films and television series in Australia, the United Kingdom, and the United States. On television, he is known for playing the lead role of Walt Longmire in the A&E/Netflix television series Longmire. On film, he is known for playing "Agent Jones" in The Matrix (1999); he also starred in Vertical Limit (2000).

Early life
Taylor was born in 1963 in Melbourne, Australia. His parents separated when he was nine, and he moved to a mining town in Western Australia to live with his aunt and uncle. He worked as a miner when he was a teenager, and later had jobs including lifeguard and bouncer. He went to university three times.

At age twenty one, Taylor went to work on an oil rig in the Indian Ocean. His ship collided with another and sank off the west coast of Australia, but he and two crew mates escaped on a lifeboat. Taylor suffered a broken arm and ribs and, while recovering in the hospital, saw an ad for auditions for drama school in Perth, at the Western Australian Academy of Performing Arts (WAAPA), which he joined after a successful audition at the age of 24.

Career
Taylor started acting professionally in 1988 after graduating from WAAPA. His first major role was in 1989 as Nicholas Walsh in the Australian television soap Home and Away. His first lead role came in 1993 when he was cast as David Griffin in the Australian mini series The Feds. He then appeared in various guest roles and on TV movies in Australia, such as Blue Heelers and Stingers, often being cast as a police officer.

Taylor's big break in Hollywood came when he was cast as the shapeshifting Agent Jones in the 1999 blockbuster The Matrix. In 2000, he starred alongside Chris O'Donnell in the action thriller Vertical Limit. His other film credits include The Hard Word (2002), Storm Warning (2007), Rogue (2007), and Coffin Rock (2009).

In 2000, Taylor took on the role of Father Vincent Sheehan in Ballykissangel, a British television drama set in Ireland. His television credits after that include MDA (2002), Satisfaction (2010), Cops L.A.C. (2010) and Killing Time (2011). In 2011, Taylor was cast for the lead role of Walt Longmire in A&E's crime drama series Longmire. The series later moved to Netflix after the third season and the network renewed the series for its sixth and final season, which aired in 2017.

Personal life
Taylor is married to producer Ayisha Davies and they have a daughter named Scarlet. He co-founded a farmer's market and community gardens in St Kilda, Victoria, called Veg Out.

Filmography

Film

Television

References

External links
 
 

1963 births
20th-century Australian male actors
21st-century Australian male actors
Australian expatriate male actors in the United States
Australian male film actors
Australian male television actors
Australian male voice actors
Living people
Male actors from Melbourne
Western Australian Academy of Performing Arts alumni
Recipients of the Medal of the Order of Australia